The 1999 Swedish Golf Tour, known as the Telia Tour for sponsorship reasons, was the 16th season of the Swedish Golf Tour, a series of professional golf tournaments held in Sweden.

A number of the tournaments also featured on the 1999 Challenge Tour (CHA). 1999 was the inaugural season of the Nordic Golf League (NGL) and all SGT tournaments featured on NGL with the exception of the Gula Sidorna Grand Opening, which was a pro-am with a limited field of 32, played jointly with the ladies Swedish Golf Tour.

Schedule
The season consisted of 15 events played between May and October.

Order of Merit

References

Swedish Golf Tour